Charles John Talbot (1873–1942) was a Liberal Party Member of Parliament in New Zealand.

He won the Temuka electorate in south Canterbury in the 1914 general election, and held it until 1919, when he was defeated by Thomas Burnett.

References

1873 births
1942 deaths
New Zealand Liberal Party MPs
Members of the New Zealand House of Representatives
New Zealand MPs for South Island electorates
Unsuccessful candidates in the 1919 New Zealand general election
Unsuccessful candidates in the 1925 New Zealand general election